Tol-e Bondu (also Romanized as Tol-e Bondū and Tal-e Bondū) is a village in Rostam-e Do Rural District, in the Central District of Rostam County, Fars Province, Iran. At the 2006 census, its population was 1,069, in 177 families.

References 

Populated places in Rostam County